Roderick Kedward may refer to:

 Rev Roderick Kedward (politician) (1881–1937), British Liberal Party politician, MP for Ashford 1929–1931
 Roderick Kedward (historian) (born 1937), British historian, grandson of the politician